Aerial Distributors was a US aircraft manufacturer established in Wichita, Kansas in 1967. It set up to develop the Distributor Wing DWA-1, an unorthodox agricultural aircraft.

References
 
 

Manufacturing companies established in 1967
Companies based in Wichita, Kansas
Defunct aircraft manufacturers of the United States
1967 establishments in Kansas